Zhushan may refer to:

Zhushan, Nantou (竹山鎮), urban township in Nantou County, Taiwan

Mainland China
Zhushan County (竹山县), Shiyan, Hubei
Zhushan District (珠山区), Jingdezhen, Jiangxi
Zhushan Subdistrict, Jingdezhen (珠山街道), in the above district
Zhushan Subdistrict, Jiaonan (珠山街道), Shandong
Zhushan, Chongqing (竹山镇), town in Liangping County
Zhushan, Xuan'en County (珠山镇), town in Hubei
Zhushan, Hunan (珠山镇), town in Lingling District, Yongzhou
Zhushan, Xinyu (珠珊镇), town in Yushui District, Xinyu, Jiangxi